Kish may refer to:

Businesses and organisations
 KISH, a radio station in Guam
 Kish Air, an Iranian airline
 Korean International School in Hanoi, Vietnam

People
 Kish (surname), including a list of people with the name
 Kish, a former stage name of Andrew Kishino (born 1970), Canadian actor and rapper
 Kish (Bible), father of Saul
 Kish, a Jaredite king in the Book of Mormon

Places
 Gishi, Nagorno-Karabakh, Azerbaijan, also called Kish
 Kiş, Shaki, Azerbaijan
 Church of Kish
 Kish Island, Iran 
 Kish, Iran, a city 
 Kish Gas Field
 Kish International Airport
 Kish District, an administrative subdivision
 Kish Rural District, an administrative subdivision
 Kish (Sumer), an ancient city now in Iraq
 Kish civilization, an ancient Mesopotamian culture
 Kish Bank, off the coast of Dublin, Ireland
 Kishacoquillas Valley, or Kish Valley, Pennsylvania, U.S.
 Kish, historic name of Shahrisabz, Uzbekistan

Other uses
 Iranian yacht Kish, a former royal yacht of the Shah of Iran
 Kish (Tokyo Mew Mew), a fictional character
 Oliver Fish and Kyle Lewis, fictional characters from the American soap opera One Life to Live
 Kish, a byproduct in steelmaking, used in Graphite recycling

See also

Kesh (disambiguation)
Kishi (disambiguation)
Kitsch
Kish grid, a sampling methodology
 Kish Khodro, Iranian auto manufacturer